David F. Anderson (born 5 June 1978 in Bridgewater, Massachusetts, USA) is a Vilas Distinguished Achievement Professor of Mathematics at the University of Wisconsin-Madison.

Education 
Anderson received his Ph.D. from Duke University in 2005.
Anderson received his B.A. in Mathematics from The University of Virginia in 2000.
Anderson graduated from Bridgewater-Raynham Regional High School in 1996.

Awards and honors 
In 2018, Anderson was named a Vilas Distinguished Achievement Professor at the University of Wisconsin-Madison.
In 2014, Anderson received the inaugural IMA Prize in Mathematics and its Applications.  Anderson received this recognition for his contributions to numerical methods for stochastic models in biology and to the mathematical theory of biological interaction networks.

Books

References

Living people
Fellows of the American Mathematical Society
21st-century American mathematicians
Duke University alumni
University of Wisconsin–Madison faculty
1978 births